Lambda Herculis (λ Herculis. abbreviated Lambda Her, λ Her), formally named Maasym , is a star in the constellation of Hercules. From parallax measurements taken during the Gaia mission, it is approximately 393 light-years from the Sun.

Nomenclature
λ Herculis (Latinised to Lambda Herculis) is the star's Bayer designation.

It bore the traditional name Maasym, from the Arabic مِعْصَم miʽṣam "wrist". In 2016, the International Astronomical Union organized a Working Group on Star Names (WGSN) to catalogue and standardize proper names for stars. The WGSN approved the name Maasym for this star on 12 September 2016 and it is now so included in the List of IAU-approved Star Names.

Description
Lambda Herculis has an apparent magnitude of 4.4. It is unclear whether the star is on the red giant branch and fusing hydrogen in a shell or on the horizontal branch (red clump) and fusing helium in its core. As a horizontal-branch star it would be about seven billion years old, but as a red-giant-branch star it would only be about four billion years old.

In 1783, English-German astronomer William Herschel described the solar apex, the point in sky towards which the Solar System is moving; using data from double stars, he identified this position as close to Lambda Herculis. Today it is known the solar apex is not so close to this star, however it is only 10° away from the position currently accepted (in Hercules, southwest of Vega).

References

Hercules (constellation)
Herculis, Lambda
K-type giants
Maasym
Herculis, 076
085693
6526
158899
Durchmusterung objects